Statistics from the 2014–15 season.

Table

Regular phase

Final four

External links
 

1
Saint Kitts and Nevis
SKNFA Super League seasons